The 2020–21 Colgate Raiders men's basketball team represented Colgate University in the 2020–21 NCAA Division I men's basketball season. The Raiders, were led by tenth-year head coach Matt Langel, play their home games at Cotterell Court in Hamilton, New York as members of the Patriot League. With the creation of mini-divisions to cut down on travel due to the COVID-19 pandemic, they played in the North Division. They finished the season 14-2, 11-1 in Patriot League Play to finish as champions of the North Division. They defeated Boston University, Bucknell, and Loyola (MD) to be champions of the Patriot League tournament. They received the conference’s automatic bid to the NCAA tournament where they lost in the first round to Arkansas.

Previous season
The Raiders finished the 2019–20 season 25–9, 14–4 in Patriot League play to win the Patriot League regular season championship. They defeated Lehigh and Lafayette to reach the championship game of the Patriot League tournament, where they lost to Boston University. As a regular season league champion who failed to win their league tournament, they received an automatic bid to the 2020 National Invitation Tournament. However, the NIT and all other postseason tournaments were cancelled amid the COVID-19 pandemic.

Roster

Schedule and results 

|-
!colspan=12 style=| Patriot League regular season

|-
!colspan=12 style=| Patriot League tournament
|-

|-
!colspan=12 style=| NCAA tournament
|-

|-

Source

References

Colgate Raiders men's basketball seasons
Colgate Raiders
Colgate Raiders men's basketball
Colgate Raiders men's basketball
Colgate